Sandtorg is a village in Harstad Municipality in Troms og Finnmark county, Norway. It is located on the eastern shore of the large island of Hinnøya, on the shore of the Tjeldsundet. The village is located along the European route E10 highway in the southern part of the municipality. There are about 300 residents in the village area.

History
Since the early 13th century, there has been a trading post at Sandtorgholmen (where the village of Sandtorg is located). This location became more important in the late 18th century when pilot services were added for foreign and local ships.  The trading post continued to be a focal point of Sandtorg until 1945 when the Norwegian Army's communication services took over the facilities after the German occupation (1940–1945).  The army returned Sandtorgholmen to civilian use in the 1990s.  Today, the Sandtorgholmen trading post features a hotel with a harbor restaurant and meeting facilities.

The municipality of Sandtorg was established on 1 July 1926, when it was split from the municipality of Trondenes. On 1 January 1964, Sandtorg was merged with the neighboring municipalities of Harstad and Trondenes to form the new Harstad Municipality.

Bjarne Berg-Sæther (born 1919) was a significant leader in Sandtorg during the 20th century. He was the mayor of Sandtorg from 1948 until 1964 when it was merged with Harstad. He was also the first mayor of the new merged municipality of Harstad, which occurred in 1964 (and therefore also the last mayor of Sandtorg). During his 20 years as mayor after World War II, boat building factories at Rødskjæret were added, lighted ski tracks, and a community cultural house was built. Many of these additions caused Sandtorg's population to almost double.

Name
The village is named after the old Sandtorg farm (Old Norse: Sandþorghom).  The first element comes from the word sandr which means "sandy area", and the second element means "square".  The name was frequently used historically for farms where there was a marketplace.

References

External links

Weather information for Sandtorg 

Harstad
Villages in Troms
Populated places of Arctic Norway